Sherman's neckties were a railway-destruction tactic used in the American Civil War. Named after Maj. Gen. William Tecumseh Sherman of the Union Army, Sherman's neckties were railway rails destroyed by heating them until they were malleable and twisting them into loops resembling neckties, often around trees. Since the Confederacy had limited supplies of iron, and few foundries to roll the rails, this destruction was very difficult to repair. They were also called Sherman's Bowties, Jeff Davis's Neckties, and Sherman's hairpins.

Although the destruction was ordered by Sherman during his Atlanta Campaign, the "necktie" shape formed by bending the rails around a tree was not; his orders specified a different method of track destruction which was not as popular:

After three days, only one Confederate railroad line leading into Atlanta remained intact.

Sherman's neckties were also a feature of Sherman's March to the Sea, a campaign designed to bring hard war, or 'serious destruction of infrastructure', to the Confederate States of America. Sherman implemented "scorched earth" policies; he and Union Army commander Lt. Gen. Ulysses S. Grant believed that the Civil War would end only if the Confederacy's strategic, economic, and psychological capacities for warfare were decisively broken.

In the early days of the Franklin-Nashville Campaign of late 1864, the Confederates employed similar tactics against Sherman's supply line, the Western and Atlantic Railroad from Chattanooga to Atlanta. The rails deformed by fire were known to the soldiers of the Army of Tennessee as "Old Mrs. Lincoln's Hair Pins."

See also 
 Railroad plough

References

External links

 
Sherman's Neckties
, a demonstration by Civil War re-enactors.

1864 in the United States
1864 in Georgia (U.S. state)
Georgia (U.S. state) in the American Civil War
History of rail transportation in the United States
Rail transportation in Georgia (U.S. state)
Necktie
Necktie
Area denial weapons
Iron